Mihajlov is a surname. Notable people with the surname include:

Dejan Mihajlov (born 1972), Serbian lawyer and politician
Gorazd Mihajlov (born 1974), Macedonian football coach and former player
Mihajlo Mihajlov (1934–2010), Serbian author, academic and publicist
Miloš Mihajlov (born 1982), Serbian footballer